Lu (c. 1042–249 BC) was a vassal state during the Zhou dynasty of ancient China located around modern Shandong province.  Founded in the 11th century BC, its rulers were from a cadet branch of the House of Ji (姬) that ruled the Zhou dynasty. The first duke was Boqin, a son of the Duke of Zhou, who was brother of King Wu of Zhou and regent to King Cheng of Zhou.

Lu was the home state of Confucius as well as Mozi, and as such has an outsized cultural influence among the states of the Eastern Zhou and in history. The Annals of Spring and Autumn, for instance, was written with the Lu rulers' years as their basis.  Another great work of Chinese history, the Zuo Zhuan or Commentary of Zuo, was also written in Lu by Zuo Qiuming.

Geography

The state's capital was in Qufu and its territory mainly covered the central and southwest regions of what is now Shandong Province.  It was bordered to the north by the powerful state of Qi and to the south by the powerful state of Chu. The position of Lu on the eastern frontiers of the Western Zhou state, facing the non-Zhou peoples in states such as Lai and Xu, was an important consideration in its foundation.

Etymology
William H. Baxter (apud Matisoff, 1995) suggests a semantic connection between the toponym 魯 Lǔ and its homophone 鹵 lŭ "salty, rock salt" (< OC *C-rāɁ) since that region was a salt marsh in ancient times.

History
Lu was one of several states founded in eastern China at the very beginning of the Zhou dynasty, in order to extend Zhou rule far from its capital at Zongzhou and power base in the Guanzhong region. Throughout Western Zhou times, it played an important role in stabilising Zhou control in modern-day Shandong.

During the early Spring and Autumn period, Lu was one of the strongest states and a rival of Qi to its north. Under Duke Yin and Duke Huan of Lu, Lu defeated both Qi and Song on several occasions. At the same time, it undertook expeditions against other minor states.

This changed by the middle of the period, as Lu's main rival, Qi, grew increasingly dominant. Although a Qi invasion was defeated in the Battle of Changshao in 684 BC, Lu would never regain the upper hand against its neighbour. Meanwhile, the power of the dukes of Lu was eventually undermined by the powerful feudal clans of Jisun 季孫, Mengsun 孟孫, and Shusun 叔孫 (called the Three Huan because they were descendants of Duke Huan of Lu). The domination of the Three Huan was such that Duke Zhao of Lu, in attempting to regain power, was exiled by them and never returned. It would not be until Duke Mu of Lu's reign, in the early Warring States period, that power eventually returned to the dukes again.

In 249 BC King Kaolie of the state of Chu invaded and annexed Lu.  Duke Qing, the last ruler of Lu, became a commoner.

The main line of the Duke of Zhou's descendants came from his firstborn son, the State of Lu ruler Bo Qin's third son Yu (魚) whose descendants adopted the surname Dongye (東野). The Duke of Zhou's offspring held the title of Wujing Boshi (五经博士; 五經博士; Wǔjīng Bóshì).

東野家族大宗世系 Family Tree of the descendants of the Duke of Zhou in Chinese

Duke Huan of Lu's son through Qingfu (慶父) was the ancestor of Mencius. The genealogy is found in the Mencius family tree (孟子世家大宗世系).

Rulers

List of Lu rulers based on the Records of the Grand Historian by Sima Qian:

Rulers family tree

See also
 Lu Commandery

References

External links

</ref>

 
Zhou dynasty
11th-century BC establishments in China
States and territories established in the 11th century BC
3rd-century BC disestablishments
1st-millennium BC disestablishments in China
Former monarchies